Sallieu Capay Tarawallie (born 3 January 1995) is a Sierra Leonean footballer who plays as a winger or forward for FC Kallon. Besides Sierra Leone, he hs played in Israel, Georgia, Swaziland, and Iceland.

Career

In 2015, Tarawallie signed for Beitar Tel Aviv Bat Yam in the Israeli second division.

Before the 2017 season, he signed for Georgian side Dila. After that, he signed for Mbabane Swallows in Swaziland.

Before the 2019 season, Tarawallie signed for Icelandic second division club Víkingur Ólafsvík.  After that, he signed for FC Kallon in Sierra Leone.

Career statistics

References

External links

 
 

1995 births
Living people
Sierra Leonean footballers
F.C. Kallon players
Beitar Tel Aviv Bat Yam F.C. players
FC Dila Gori players
Ungmennafélagið Víkingur players
Mbabane Swallows players
Liga Leumit players
Erovnuli Liga players
1. deild karla players
Sierra Leonean expatriate footballers
Sierra Leone international footballers
Expatriate footballers in Israel
Expatriate footballers in Georgia (country)
Expatriate footballers in Eswatini
Expatriate footballers in Iceland
Sierra Leonean expatriate sportspeople in Israel
Sierra Leonean expatriate sportspeople in Georgia (country)
Sierra Leonean expatriate sportspeople in Eswatini
Sierra Leonean expatriate sportspeople in Iceland
Association football forwards
Association football wingers